Mhicca Carter (born 23 March 1990) is an Australian athlete who plays Australian rules football and rugby union.

Biography 
Carter played age-group basketball and touch football for New Zealand. She also played a bit of club rugby in Marlborough. In 2011, Carter moved from New Zealand to Australia at the age of 20.

Rugby career 
Carter played women's rugby union domestically for RugbyWA in the Super W and internationally for the Wallaroos. She made her test debut for the Wallaroos in 2018.

Aussie rules career 
Carter switched sports and played Aussie rules for the West Coast Eagles in the 2019 AFL Women's season. She was delisted by the Eagles on 9 June 2021, after playing 1 game with the team throughout her career.

References

External links

 

Living people
1990 births
Rugby union fullbacks
Australian female rugby union players
Australia women's international rugby union players
West Coast Eagles (AFLW) players